Carl Kaysen (March 5, 1920 – February 8, 2010) was an American academic, policy advisor and international security specialist at the Massachusetts Institute of Technology (MIT) and co-chair of the Committee on International Security Studies at the American Academy of Arts and Sciences. He is the father of Girl, Interrupted author Susanna Kaysen. He was married for 50 years to Annette Neutra until her death in 1990. In 1994, he married Ruth Butler.

Carl Kaysen worked for President John F. Kennedy as Deputy National Security Advisor, and was directly under National Security Advisor McGeorge Bundy. Kaysen took over the position from Walt Rostow in 1961 and concentrated on the key issues of the Kennedy Administration such as nuclear weapons, foreign trade, international economic policy and international security policy.

On President Kennedy's orders, Kaysen prepared a report on how to utilize the US nuclear arsenal to preemptively destroy the Soviet Union’s nuclear capacity and its ability to retaliate with nuclear weapons.

Kaysen was also a good friend of long-serving Greek Prime Minister Andreas Papandreou, whom he had met at Harvard. After Greece was taken over by a military junta in 1967, Kaysen and John Kenneth Galbraith were instrumental in convincing President Lyndon B. Johnson to decisively intervene in order to secure Papandreou's release from prison.

Educational background
Kaysen was born in Philadelphia, the son of Elizabeth and Samuel Kaysen.

Kaysen received his B.A. from the University of Pennsylvania in 1940 where he was elected Phi Beta Kappa and was a member of the Philomathean Society. He received both his M.S. in 1947, and Ph.D. in 1954 from Harvard University in Economics. He also did graduate study at Columbia University from 1940 to 1946.

Work and research
Kaysen's early work was in the areas where economics, sociology, politics and law intersect. Later, his research focused on arms control, international organizations and international politics.

He co-authored Peace Operations by the United Nations: The Case for a Volunteer Military Force (1996) and co-edited The United States and the Fundamental Criminal Court: National Security and Fundamental Law (2000).

He edited and contributed to a volume of essays, The American Corporation Today (1996).

Career
Between 1940 and 1942 he was on the staff of the National Bureau of Economic Research. From 1942 to 1943 he was an Economist for the U.S. Office of Strategic Services, and from 1943 to 1945 he was in Intelligence for the U.S. Army Air Forces, rising from private to captain.

After receiving his M.A. from Harvard University in 1947, he was an assistant professor there from 1950 to 1955, and was a clerk to Judge E. E. Wyzanski, U.S. District Court from 1950 to 1952, providing economic analysis for United States v. United Shoe Corporation, a major antitrust case.

In 1954 he received his Ph.D. from Harvard and did military and wartime Service. In 1955, he became an associate professor at Harvard, and in 1957, a full professor of economics. He served as associate dean, Graduate School of Public Administration, Harvard University, from 1960 to 1966.

From 1961 to 1963, he was Deputy National Security Advisor to President John F. Kennedy, a position in which he concentrated on foreign trade, economic policy, and the potential use of nuclear weapons. In this capacity, he was asked to prepare a report on how to utilize the US nuclear arsenal to preemptively destroy the Soviet Union’s nuclear capacity and its ability to retaliate with nuclear weapons.  Though Kaysen was merely fulfilling Kennedy’s demand for alternative nuclear war strategies in case of conflict over Berlin, his report, which envisioned ‘only’ half a million to a million Soviet casualties, caused outrage and disgust within the administration, with White House Chief Counsel Ted Sorensen strongly criticizing him. During the Cuban Missile Crisis, he became known as the "Vice President in charge of the rest of the world."

He was named Lucius N. Littauer Professor of Political Economy, at Harvard University from 1964 to 1966.

He served as Director of the Institute for Advanced Study from 1966 to 1976, taking over the position from J. Robert Oppenheimer.

Kaysen joined the MIT faculty in 1976 and in 1977 named as David W. Skinner Professor of Political Economy.

From 1978 to 1980, he was Vice Chairman and Director of Research for the Sloan Commission on Higher Education, an initiative that explored the increasingly complex relationship between government and institutions of higher education.

From 1981 until his death, he was the Director, Program in Science, Technology and Society, at MIT.

He had been a Junior Fellow of the Society of Fellows at Harvard University and a Guggenheim Fellow, and was a member of the American Academy of Arts and Sciences and the American Philosophical Society.

Health issues and death
Kaysen had spinal stenosis in the final decade of his life. In October 2009, he suffered a bad fall; his health began to fail, and he died in his home in Cambridge, Massachusetts on February 8, 2010. The documentary Inside Job was dedicated to him in 2010.

Selected publications 
“United States v. United Shoe Machinery Corporation”: An Economic Analysis of an Anti-Trust Case, 1956
The American Business Creed (with Francis X. Sutton, Seymour E. Harris, and James. Tobin), 1956
Anti-Trust Policy: An Economic and Legal Analysis (with Donald F. Turner), 1959
The Demand for Electricity in the United States (with Franklin M. Fisher), 1962
The Higher Learning: The Universities and the Public, 1969
Content and Context: Essays on College Education (editor), 1973
A Debate on “A Time to Choose” (with William Tavoulareas), 1977
Program for Renewed Partnership:  A Report, 1980.
Nuclear Weapons After the Cold War (Foreign Affairs), 1991
War with Iraq: Costs, Consequences, and Alternatives (American Academy of Arts and Sciences), 2002

References
 Fisher, Franklin M., "Carl Kaysen: 5 March 1920 . 8  February 2010", Proceedings of the American Philosophical Society, Vol. 156, No. 3, September 2012

External links
American Academy of Arts and Sciences' Committee on International Security Studies
CIS Scholar Spotlight on Carl Kaysen
Dr. Carl Kaysen's faculty web page at MIT
JFK Library file
 

1920 births
2010 deaths
Accidental deaths from falls
Accidental deaths in Massachusetts
American Jews
Columbia Graduate School of Arts and Sciences alumni
Harvard University alumni
Massachusetts Institute of Technology faculty
People from Boston
Scientists from Philadelphia
University of Pennsylvania alumni
Directors of the Institute for Advanced Study
Economists from Pennsylvania
Economists from Massachusetts
United States Deputy National Security Advisors